Caviramidae is a group of basal pterosaurs. It was erected by paleontologist Matthew G. Baron in 2020. It was defined as the least inclusive clade that includes Arcticodactylus cromptonellus and Caviramus schesaplanensis. 

The members of Caviramidae are also considered to belong to either the family Eudimorphodontidae (Arcticodactylus and Carniadactylus), the family Raeticodactylidae (Caviramus and Raeticodactylus), or just basal eopterosaurians (Austriadraco and Seazzadactylus). However, Baron, the author of Caviramidae, concluded in his analyses that both Eopterosauria and Eudimorphodontidae are not monophyletic groups, therefore he created the family Caviramidae to contain most of the eudimorphodontids and basal eopterosaurians. Additionally, Baron included the clade Austriadraconidae as a subgroup within the Caviramidae to include three genera: Arcticodactylus, Austriadraco, and Seazzadactylus.

References

Pterosaurs